Milton Leroy "Mickey" Erickson (May 16, 1905 – January 1984) was an American football offensive lineman in the National Football League (NFL) for the Chicago Cardinals and Boston Braves.  He played college football at Northwestern University.

External links
 
 

1905 births
1984 deaths
American football centers
Boston Braves (NFL) players
Chicago Cardinals players
Northwestern Wildcats football players
Sportspeople from Minnesota
People from Cambridge, Minnesota